Vision Football Club is a Ghanaian football club based in Accra. It is currently playing in the Ghana's Division One League.

History
The club was founded in 1999 as Eleven Strangers. In 2001, the club was renamed to Vision Football Club. The club was registered in Division Three in 2007, absorbing graduated U-17 boys. In 2009, Vision Football Club qualified for the Greater Accra Regional Second Division, placing fourth out of twelve teams during the 2009–10 season.

The club has brought in Serbian international coaches for every season since 2009. In the 2010–11 and 2011–12 seasons, they were the league winners of the Greater Accra Regional Second Division – Zone 4. The club played in the F.A Cup competition in 2010/2011.  In 2014, some of Vision FC players were sent out of Ghana to play with international teams.

Vision Football Club has three youth teams: Validus Football Club in the Regional Division Two, U-17, and U-15 teams.

The Club Management

Founder - George Aforklenyuie

President - Michael Osekre

Vice President – Obiri Kwaku

Administrative Manager - Wisdom Vandyke Cudjoe

Financial Manager - Amin Ramadan

Technical Director -

Coach – Prince Owusu

Former players

 Bismarck Appiah
 Melvin Banda
 Joseph Cudjoe
 Samuel Kwame Owusu
 Zakaria Suraka
 Emmanue Addae Dei
 Laud Amoah
 Daniel Amoako
 Michael Baidoo
 Ernest Boateng
 Alex Yamoah

Coach history

References

External links
Official website

Football clubs in Ghana
Association football clubs established in 1999
Football clubs in Accra
1999 establishments in Ghana